The Humphrey–Williams Plantation (also known as the Humphrey–Williams–Smith House and Plantation) is a historic plantation complex located near Lumberton, Robeson County, North Carolina.  The Humphrey–Williams House was built about 1846 with the forced labor of enslaved people, and is a two-story, five bay, vernacular Greek Revival style frame farmhouse.  It features a one-story, full-width shed porch.  Also on the property are the contributing William Humphrey House (c. 1784), Annie Fairly's House (c. 1935), tobacco barn (c. 1900), a carriage house (c. 1900), a smokehouse, a store-post office (1835-1856), and the agricultural landscape.
 
The main house, on a  property, was listed on the National Register of Historic Places in 1973, as Humphrey–Williams House.  The larger plantation, including 5 contributing buildings and 1 additional contributing site on a  property, was re-listed in a boundary increase listing in 1988.

References

Plantation houses in North Carolina
Farms on the National Register of Historic Places in North Carolina
Greek Revival houses in North Carolina
Houses completed in 1784
Buildings and structures in Robeson County, North Carolina
National Register of Historic Places in Robeson County, North Carolina
Historic districts on the National Register of Historic Places in North Carolina